The lazy caterer's sequence, more formally known as the central polygonal numbers, describes the maximum number of pieces of a disk (a pancake or pizza is usually used to describe the situation) that can be made with a given number of straight cuts. For example, three cuts across a pancake will produce six pieces if the cuts all meet at a common point inside the circle, but up to seven if they do not. This problem can be formalized mathematically as one of counting the cells in an arrangement of lines; for generalizations to higher dimensions, see arrangement of hyperplanes.

The analogue of this sequence in three dimensions is the cake numbers.

Formula and sequence

The maximum number p of pieces that can be created with a given number of cuts  (where ) is given by the formula

Using binomial coefficients, the formula can be expressed as

Simply put, each number equals a triangular number plus 1.

As the third column of Bernoulli's triangle (k = 2) is a triangular number plus one, it forms the lazy caterer's sequence for n cuts, where n ≥ 2.

The sequence can be alternatively derived from the sum of up to the first 3 terms of each row of Pascal's triangle:
{| class="wikitable" style="text-align:right;"
!  !! 0 !! 1 !! 2
! rowspan="11" style="padding:0;"| !! Sum
|-
! style="text-align:left;"|0
| 1 || - ||  - ||  1
|-
! style="text-align:left;"|1
| 1 || 1 ||  - ||  2
|-
! style="text-align:left;"|2
| 1 || 2 ||  1 ||  4
|-
! style="text-align:left;"|3
| 1 || 3 ||  3 ||  7
|-
! style="text-align:left;"|4
| 1 || 4 ||  6 || 11
|-
! style="text-align:left;"|5
| 1 || 5 || 10 || 16
|-
! style="text-align:left;"|6
| 1 || 6 || 15 || 22
|-
! style="text-align:left;"|7
| 1 || 7 || 21 || 29
|-
! style="text-align:left;"|8
| 1 || 8 || 28 || 37
|-
! style="text-align:left;"|9
| 1 || 9 || 36 || 46
|}

1, 2, 4, 7, 11, 16, 22, 29, 37, 46, 56, 67, 79, 92, 106, 121, 137, 154, 172, 191, 211, ...

Its three-dimensional analogue is known as the cake numbers. The difference between successive cake numbers gives the lazy caterer's sequence.

Proof

To obtain the maximum number of pieces, the th cut line should cross all the other previous cut lines inside the circle, but not cross any intersection of previous cut lines. Thus, the th line itself is cut in  places, and into  line segments.  Each segment divides one piece of the -cut pancake into 2 parts, adding exactly  to the number of pieces. The new line cannot have any more segments since it can only cross each previous line once.  A cut line can always cross over all previous cut lines, as rotating the knife at a small angle around a point that is not an existing intersection will, if the angle is small enough, intersect all the previous lines including the last one added.

Thus, the total number of pieces after  cuts is

This recurrence relation can be solved.  If  is expanded one term, the relation becomes

Since , because there is one piece before any cuts are made, this can be rewritten as

This can be simplified, using the formula for the sum of an arithmetic progression:

See also
Cake number
Floyd's triangle
Dividing a circle into areas – where n is the number of sides of an inscribed polygon

Notes

References
.

.

.

External links

Mathematical optimization
Integer sequences
Articles containing proofs